Wharton's jelly (substantia gelatinea funiculi umbilicalis) is a gelatinous substance within the umbilical cord, largely made up of mucopolysaccharides (hyaluronic acid and chondroitin sulfate). It acts as a mucous connective tissue containing some fibroblasts and macrophages, and is derived from extra-embryonic mesoderm of the connecting stalk.

Umbilical cord occlusion

As a mucous connective tissue, it is rich in proteoglycans, and protects and insulates umbilical blood vessels. Wharton's jelly, when exposed to temperature changes, collapses structures within the umbilical cord and thus provides a physiological clamping of the cord, typically three minutes after birth.

Stem cells
Cells in Wharton's jelly express several stem cell genes, including telomerase. They can be extracted, cultured, and induced to differentiate into mature cell types such as neurons. Wharton's jelly is therefore a potential source of adult stem cells, often collected from cord blood. Wharton's jelly-derived mesenchymal stem cells may have immunomodulatory effect on lymphocytes.
Wharton's jelly tissue transplantation has shown to be able to reduce traumatic brain injury in rats.

Etymology
It is named for the English physician and anatomist Thomas Wharton (1614–1673) who first described it in his publication Adenographia, or "The Description of the Glands of the Entire Body", first published in 1656.

References

External links

 
 Cross-section microscopic slide views of umbilical cord ucsd.edu

Reproduction in mammals
Animal developmental biology
Embryology